An earthing system (UK and IEC) or grounding system (US) connects specific parts of an electric power system with the ground, typically the Earth's conductive surface, for safety and functional purposes.   The choice of earthing system can affect the safety and electromagnetic compatibility of the installation. Regulations for earthing systems vary among countries, though most follow the recommendations of the International Electrotechnical Commission (IEC). Regulations may identify special cases for earthing in mines, in patient care areas, or in hazardous areas of industrial plants.

In addition to electric power systems, other systems may require grounding for safety or function.  Tall structures may have lightning rods as part of a system to protect them from lightning strikes.  Telegraph lines may use the Earth as one conductor of a circuit, saving the cost of installation of a return wire over a long circuit. Radio antennas may require particular grounding for operation, as well as to control static electricity and provide lightning protection.

Purposes
There are three main purposes for earthing:

System earthing
System earthing serves a purpose of electrical safety throughout the system that is not caused by an electrical fault. Its main purpose is to prevent static buildup and to protect against power surges caused by nearby lightning strikes or switching. Static buildup, as induced by friction for example, such as when wind blows onto a radio mast, is dissipated to the Earth. In the event of a surge, a lightning arrester, a surge arrester or a SPD will divert the excess current to the Earth before it reaches an appliance.

System earthing also allows for equipotential bonding to all metalworks to prevent potential differences between them. Having Earth as a common reference point also keeps the electrical system's potential difference limited to the supply voltage.

Equipment earthing 
Equipment earthing serves a purpose of electrical safety in an electrical fault. Its main purpose is to prevent equipment damage and the risk of an electric shock. This type of earthing is not an earth connection, technically speaking. When current flows from a line conductor to an earth wire, as is the case when a line conductor makes contact with an earthed surface in a Class I appliance, an automatic disconnection of supply (ADS) device such as a circuit breaker or a RCD will automatically open the circuit to clear the fault.

Functional earthing
Functional earthing serves a purpose other than electrical safety. Example purposes include electromagnetic interference (EMI) filtering in an EMI filter, and the use of the Earth as a return path in a single-wire earth return distribution system.

Low-voltage systems
In low-voltage networks, which distribute the electric power to the widest class of end users, the main concern for design of earthing systems is safety of consumers who use the electric appliances and their protection against electric shocks. The earthing system, in combination with protective devices such as fuses and residual current devices, must ultimately ensure that a person does not come into contact with a metallic object whose potential relative to the person's potential exceeds a safe threshold, typically set at about 50 V.

In most developed countries, 220 V, 230 V, or 240 V sockets with earthed contacts were introduced either just before or soon after World War II, though with considerable national variation. However in the United States and Canada, where the supply voltage is only 120 V power outlets installed before the mid-1960s generally did not include a ground (earth) pin.  In the developing world, local wiring practice may or may not provide a connection to an earth.

On low voltage electricity networks with a phase to neutral voltage exceeding 240 V to 690 V, which are mostly used in industry, mining equipment and machines rather than publicly accessible networks, the earthing system design is equally important from safety point of view as for domestic users.
 
From 1947 to 1996 for ranges (including separate cooktops and ovens) and 1953 to 1996 for clothes dryers, US National Electrical Code allowed the supply neutral wire to be used as the equipment enclosure connection to ground if the circuit originated in the main service panel. This was permitted for plug-in equipment and permanently connected equipment. Normal imbalances in the circuit would create small equipment to ground voltages, a failure of the neutral conductor or connections would allow the equipment to go to full 120 volts to ground, an easily lethal situation.  The 1996 and newer editions of the NEC no longer permit this practice.  For similar reasons, most countries have now mandated dedicated protective earth connections in consumer wiring that are now almost universal. In the distribution networks, where connections are fewer and less vulnerable, many countries allow the earth and neutral to share a conductor.

If the fault path between accidentally energized objects and the supply connection has low impedance, the fault current will be so large that the circuit overcurrent protection device (fuse or circuit breaker) will open to clear the ground fault. Where the earthing system does not provide a low-impedance metallic conductor between equipment enclosures and supply return (such as in a TT separately earthed system), fault currents are smaller, and will not necessarily operate the overcurrent protection device. In such case a residual-current device is installed to detect the current leaking to ground and interrupt the circuit.

IEC terminology
International standard IEC 60364 distinguishes three families of earthing arrangements, using the two-letter codes TN, TT, and IT.

The first letter indicates the connection between earth and the power-supply equipment (generator or transformer):

 "T" — Direct connection of a point with earth (Latin: terra)
 "I" — No point is connected with earth (Latin: īnsulātum), except perhaps via a high impedance.

The second letter indicates the connection between earth or network and the electrical device being supplied:

 "T" — Earth connection is by a local direct connection to earth (Latin: terra), usually via a ground rod.
 "N" — the earth connection is supplied by the electricity supply network, either separately to the neutral conductor (TN-S), combined with the neutral conductor (TN-C), or both (TN-C-S). These are discussed below.

Types of TN networks

In a TN earthing system, one of the points in the generator or transformer is connected with earth, usually the star point in a three-phase system. The body of the electrical device is connected with earth via this earth connection at the transformer.
This arrangement is a current standard for residential and industrial electric systems particularly in Europe.

The conductor that connects the exposed metallic parts of the consumer's electrical installation is called protective earth (PE; see also: Ground). The conductor that connects to the star point in a three-phase system, or that carries the return current in a single-phase system, is called neutral (N). Three variants of TN systems are distinguished:
 TN−S PE and N are separate conductors that are connected together only near the power source.  
 TN−C A combined PEN conductor fulfills the functions of both a PE and an N conductor. (on 230/400 V systems normally only used for distribution networks)
  Part of the system uses a combined PEN conductor, which is at some point split up into separate PE and N lines. The combined PEN conductor typically occurs between the substation and the entry point into the building, and earth and neutral are separated in the service head.  In the UK, this system is also known as protective multiple earthing (PME), because of the practice of connecting the combined neutral-and-earth conductor via the shortest practicable route to local earth rods at the source and at intervals along the distribution networks to each premises, to provide both system earthing and equipment earthing at each of these locations.  Similar systems in Australia and New Zealand are designated as multiple earthed neutral (MEN) and, in North America, as multi-grounded neutral (MGN).

It is possible to have both TN-S and TN-C-S supplies taken from the same transformer. For example, the sheaths on some underground cables corrode and stop providing good earth connections, and so homes where high resistance "bad earths" are found may be converted to TN-C-S. This is only possible on a network when the neutral is suitably robust against failure, and conversion is not always possible. The PEN must be suitably reinforced against failure, as an open circuit PEN can impress full phase voltage on any exposed metal connected to the system earth downstream of the break. The alternative is to provide a local  earth and convert to TT.
The main attraction of a TN network is the low impedance earth path allows easy automatic disconnection (ADS) on a high current circuit in the case of a line-to-PE short circuit as the same breaker or fuse will operate for either L-N or L-PE faults, and an RCD is not needed to detect earth faults.

TT network

In a TT (Latin: terra-terra) earthing system, the protective earth connection for the consumer is provided by a local earth electrode, (sometimes referred to as the Terra-Firma connection) and there is another independently installed at the generator. There is no 'earth wire' between the two.
The fault loop impedance is higher, and unless the electrode impedance is very low indeed, a TT installation should always have an RCD (GFCI) as its first isolator.

The big advantage of the TT earthing system is the reduced conducted interference from other users' connected equipment. TT has always been preferable for special applications like telecommunication sites that benefit from the interference-free earthing. Also, TT networks do not pose any serious risks in the case of a broken neutral. In addition, in locations where power is distributed overhead, earth conductors are not at risk of becoming live should any overhead distribution conductor be fractured by, say, a fallen tree or branch.

In pre-RCD era, the TT earthing system was unattractive for general use because of the difficulty of arranging reliable automatic disconnection (ADS) in the case of a line-to-PE short circuit (in comparison with TN systems, where the same breaker or fuse will operate for either L-N or L-PE faults). But as residual current devices mitigate this disadvantage, the TT earthing system has become much more attractive providing that all AC power circuits are RCD-protected. In some countries (such as the UK) TT is recommended for situations where a low impedance equipotential zone is impractical to maintain by bonding, where there is significant outdoor wiring, such as supplies to mobile homes and some agricultural settings, or where a high fault current could pose other dangers, such as at fuel depots or marinas.

The TT earthing system is used throughout Japan, with RCD units in most industrial settings or even at home.  This can impose added requirements on variable frequency drives and switched-mode power supplies which often have substantial filters passing high frequency noise to the ground conductor.

IT network

In an IT network (isolé-terre), the electrical distribution system has no connection to earth at all, or it has only a high-impedance connection.

Comparison

Other terminologies
While the national wiring regulations for buildings of many countries follow the IEC 60364 terminology, in North America (United States and Canada), the term "equipment grounding conductor" refers to equipment grounds and ground wires on branch circuits, and "grounding electrode conductor" is used for conductors bonding an Earth/Ground rod, electrode or similar to a service panel. The "local" Earth/Ground electrode provides "system grounding" at each building where it is installed.

The "Grounded" current carrying conductor is the system "neutral".
Australian and New Zealand standards use a modified protective multiple earthing (PME ) system called multiple earthed neutral (MEN). The neutral is grounded (earthed) at each consumer service point thereby effectively bringing the neutral potential difference towards zero along the whole length of LV lines. In the IEC 60364 terminology this is called TN-C-S.
In North America, the term "multigrounded neutral" system (MGN) is used.

In the UK and some Commonwealth countries, the term "PNE", meaning phase-neutral-earth is used to indicate that three (or more for non-single-phase connections) conductors are used, i.e., PN-S.

Resistance-earthed neutral (India)
A resistance earth system is used for mining in India as per Central Electricity Authority Regulations. Instead of a solid connection of neutral to earth,  a neutral grounding resistor (NGR) is used to limit the current to ground to less than 750 mA. Due to  the fault current restriction it is safer for gassy mines. Since the earth leakage is restricted, leakage protection devices can be set to less than 750 mA. By comparison, in a  solidly earthed system, earth fault current can be as much as the available short-circuit current.

The neutral earthing resistor is monitored to detect an interrupted ground connection and to shut off power if a fault is detected.

Earth leakage protection
To avoid accidental shock, current sensing circuits are used at the source to isolate the power when leakage current exceeds a certain limit. Residual-current devices (RCDs, RCCBs or GFCIs) are used for this purpose. Previously, an earth leakage circuit breaker is used. In industrial applications, earth leakage relays are used with separate core balanced current transformers. This protection works in the range of milli-Amps and can be set from 30 mA to 3000 mA.

Earth connectivity check
A separate pilot wire is run from distribution/ equipment supply system in addition to earth wire, to supervise the continuity of the wire. This is used in the trailing cables of mining machinery. If the earth wire is broken, the pilot wire allows a sensing device at the source end to interrupt power to the machine. This type of circuit is a must for portable heavy electric equipment (like LHD (Load, Haul, Dump machine)) being used in underground mines.

Properties

Cost
 TN networks save the cost of a low-impedance earth connection at the site of each consumer. Such a connection (a buried metal structure) is required to provide protective earth in IT and TT systems.
 TN-C networks save the cost of an additional conductor needed for separate N and PE connections. However, to mitigate the risk of broken neutrals, special cable types and many connections to earth are needed.
 TT networks require proper RCD (Ground fault interrupter) protection.

Safety
 In TN, an insulation fault is very likely to lead to a high short-circuit current that will trigger an overcurrent circuit-breaker or fuse and disconnect the L conductors. With TT systems, the earth fault loop impedance can be too high to do this, or too high to do it within the required time, so an RCD (formerly ELCB) is usually employed. Earlier TT installations may lack this important safety feature, allowing the CPC (Circuit Protective Conductor or PE) and perhaps associated metallic parts within reach of persons (exposed-conductive-parts and extraneous-conductive-parts) to become energized for extended periods under fault conditions, which is a real danger.
 In TN-S and TT systems (and in TN-C-S beyond the point of the split), a residual-current device can be used for additional protection. In the absence of any insulation fault in the consumer device, the equation IL1+IL2+IL3+IN = 0 holds, and an RCD can disconnect the supply as soon as this sum reaches a threshold (typically 10 mA – 500 mA). An insulation fault between either L or N and PE will trigger an RCD with high probability.
 In IT and TN-C networks, residual current devices are far less likely to detect an insulation fault. In a TN-C system, they would also be very vulnerable to unwanted triggering from contact between earth conductors of circuits on different RCDs or with real ground, thus making their use impracticable. Also, RCDs usually isolate the neutral core. Since it is unsafe to do this in a TN-C system, RCDs on TN-C should be wired to only interrupt the line conductor.
 In single-ended single-phase systems where the Earth and neutral are combined (TN-C, and the part of TN-C-S systems which uses a combined neutral and earth core), if there is a contact problem in the PEN conductor, then all parts of the earthing system beyond the break will rise to the potential of the L conductor. In an unbalanced multi-phase system, the potential of the earthing system will move towards that of the most loaded line conductor. Such a rise in the potential of the neutral beyond the break is known as a neutral inversion. Therefore, TN-C connections must not go across plug/socket connections or flexible cables, where there is a higher probability of contact problems than with fixed wiring. There is also a risk if a cable is damaged, which can be mitigated by the use of concentric cable construction and multiple earth electrodes. Due to the (small) risks of the lost neutral raising 'earthed' metal work to a dangerous potential, coupled with the increased shock risk from proximity to good contact with true earth, the use of TN-C-S supplies is banned in the UK for caravan sites and shore supply to boats, and strongly discouraged for use on farms and outdoor building  sites, and in such cases it is  recommended to make all outdoor wiring TT with RCD and a separate earth electrode.
 In IT systems, a single insulation fault is unlikely to cause dangerous currents to flow through a human body in contact with earth, because no low-impedance circuit exists for such a current to flow. However, a first insulation fault can effectively turn an IT system into a TN system, and then a second insulation fault can lead to dangerous body currents. Worse, in a multi-phase system, if one of the line conductors made contact with earth, it would cause the other phase cores to rise to the phase-phase voltage relative to earth rather than the phase-neutral voltage. IT systems also experience larger transient overvoltages than other systems.
 In TN-C and TN-C-S systems, any connection between the combined neutral-and-earth core and the body of the earth could end up carrying significant current under normal conditions, and could carry even more under a broken neutral situation. Therefore, main equipotential bonding conductors must be sized with this in mind; use of TN-C-S is inadvisable in situations such as petrol stations, where there is a combination of much buried metalwork and explosive gases.

Electromagnetic compatibility
 In TN-S and TT systems, the consumer has a low-noise connection to earth, which does not suffer from the voltage that appears on the N conductor as a result of the return currents and the impedance of that conductor. This is of particular importance with some types of telecommunication and measurement equipment.
 In TT systems, each consumer has its own connection to earth, and will not notice any currents that may be caused by other consumers on a shared PE line.

Regulations
 In the United States National Electrical Code and Canadian Electrical Code, the feed from the distribution transformer uses a combined neutral and grounding conductor, but within the structure separate neutral and protective earth conductors are used (TN-C-S). The neutral must be connected to earth only on the supply side of the customer's disconnecting switch.
 In Argentina, France (TT) and Australia (TN-C-S), the customers must provide their own ground connections.
 Appliances in Japan must comply with PSE law, and building wiring uses TT earthing in most installations.
 In Australia, the multiple earthed neutral (MEN) earthing system is used and is described in Section 5 of AS/NZS 3000. For an LV customer, it is a TN-C system from the transformer in the street to the premises, (the neutral is earthed multiple times along this segment), and a TN-S system inside the installation, from the Main Switchboard downwards. Looked at as a whole, it is a TN-C-S system.
 In Denmark the high voltage regulation (Stærkstrømsbekendtgørelsen) and Malaysia the Electricity Ordinance 1994 states that all consumers must use TT earthing, though in rare cases TN-C-S may be allowed (used in the same manner as in the United States). Rules are different when it comes to larger companies.
 In India as per Central Electricity Authority Regulations, CEAR, 2010, rule 41, there is provision of earthing,  neutral wire of a 3-phase, 4-wire system and the additional third wire of a 2-phase, 3-wire system. Earthing is to be done with two separate connections.  The grounding system must also have a minimum of two or more earth pits (electrodes) to better ensure proper grounding.  According to rule 42, installation with connected load above 5 kW exceeding 250 V shall have a suitable Earth leakage protective device to isolate the load in case of earth fault or leakage.

Application examples
 In the areas of UK where underground power cabling is prevalent, the TN-S system is common.
 In India LT supply is generally through TN-S system. Neutral is double grounded at each distribution transformer. Neutral and earth conductors run separately on overhead distribution lines. Separate conductors for overhead lines and armoring of cables are used for earth connection. Additional earth electrodes/pits are installed at each user end to provide redundant path to earth. 
 Most modern homes in Europe have a TN-C-S earthing system. The combined neutral and earth occurs between the nearest transformer substation and the service cut out (the fuse before the meter). After this, separate earth and neutral cores are used in all the internal wiring.
 Older urban and suburban homes in the UK tend to have TN-S supplies, with the earth connection delivered through the lead sheath of an underground lead-and-paper cable.
 The IT system with 230V between the phases is quite extensively used in Norway. It is estimated that 70% of all households are connected to the grid via the IT system. Newer residential areas are however mostly built with TN-C-S, in a large degree driven by the fact that three-phase products for the consumer market - such as electric vehicle charging stations - are developed for the European market where TN systems with 400V between the phases dominate.
 Some older homes, especially those built before the invention of residual-current circuit breakers and wired home area networks, use an in-house TN-C arrangement. This is no longer recommended practice.
 Laboratory rooms, medical facilities, construction sites, repair workshops, mobile electrical installations, and other environments that are supplied via engine-generators where there is an increased risk of insulation faults, often use an IT earthing arrangement supplied from isolation transformers. To mitigate the two-fault issues with IT systems, the isolation transformers should supply only a small number of loads each and should be protected with an insulation monitoring device (generally used only by medical, railway or military IT systems, because of cost).
 In remote areas, where the cost of an additional PE conductor outweighs the cost of a local earth connection, TT networks are commonly used in some countries, especially in older properties or in rural areas, where safety might otherwise be threatened by the fracture of an overhead PE conductor by, say, a fallen tree branch. TT supplies to individual properties are also seen in mostly TN-C-S systems where an individual property is considered unsuitable for TN-C-S supply.
 In Australia, New Zealand and Israel the TN-C-S system is in use; however, the wiring rules state that, in addition, each customer must provide a separate connection to earth, via a dedicated Earth electrode. (Any metallic water pipes entering the consumer's premises must also be "bonded" to the Earthing point at the distribution Switchboard/Panel.)  In Australia and New Zealand the connection between the protective earth bar and the neutral bar at the main Switchboard/Panel is called the multiple earthed neutral Link or MEN Link. This MEN link is removable for installation testing purposes, but is connected during normal service by either a locking system (locknuts for instance) or two or more screws. In the MEN system, the integrity of the neutral is paramount. In Australia, new installations must also bond the foundation concrete re-enforcing under wet areas to the protective earth conductor (AS3000), typically increasing the size of the earthing (i.e. reducing resistance), and providing an equipotential plane in areas such as bathrooms.  In older installations, it is not uncommon to find only the water pipe bond, and it is allowed to remain as such, but the additional earth electrode must be installed if any upgrade work is done.  The incoming protective earth/neutral conductor is connected to a neutral bar (located on the customer's side of the electricity meter's neutral connection) which is then connected via the customer's MEN link to the earth bar – beyond this point, the protective earth and neutral conductors are separate.

High-voltage systems

In high-voltage networks (above 1 kV), which are far less accessible to the general public, the focus of earthing system design is less on safety and more on reliability of supply, reliability of protection, and impact on the equipment in presence of a short circuit. Only the magnitude of phase-to-ground short circuits, which are the most common, is significantly affected with the choice of earthing system, as the current path is mostly closed through the earth. Three-phase HV/MV power transformers, located in distribution substations, are the most common source of supply for distribution networks, and type of grounding of their neutral determines the earthing system.

There are five types of neutral earthing:
 Solid-earthed neutral
 Unearthed neutral
 Resistance-earthed neutral
 Low-resistance earthing
 High-resistance earthing
 Reactance-earthed neutral 
 Using earthing transformers (such as the Zigzag transformer)

Solid-earthed neutral
In solid or directly earthed neutral, transformer's star point is directly connected to the ground. In this solution, a low-impedance path is provided for the ground fault current to close and, as result, their magnitudes are comparable with three-phase fault currents. Since the neutral remains at the potential close to the ground, voltages in unaffected phases remain at levels similar to the pre-fault ones; for that reason, this system is regularly used in high-voltage transmission networks, where insulation costs are high.

Resistance-earthed neutral
To limit short circuit earth fault an additional neutral earthing resistor (NER) is added between the neutral of transformer's star point and earth.

Low-resistance earthing
With low resistance fault current limit is relatively high. In India it is restricted for 50 A for open cast mines according to Central Electricity Authority Regulations, CEAR, 2010, rule 100.

High-resistance earthing 
High resistance grounding system grounds the neutral through a resistance which limits the ground fault current to a value equal to or slightly greater than the capacitive charging current of that system

Unearthed neutral
In unearthed, isolated or floating neutral system, as in the IT system, there is no direct connection of the star point (or any other point in the network) and the ground. As a result, ground fault currents have no path to be closed and thus have negligible magnitudes. However, in practice, the fault current will not be equal to zero: conductors in the circuit — particularly underground cables — have an inherent capacitance towards the earth, which provides a path of relatively high impedance.

Systems with isolated neutral may continue operation and provide uninterrupted supply even in presence of a ground fault. However, while the fault is present, the potential of other two phases relative to the ground reaches  of the normal operating voltage, creating additional stress for the insulation; insulation failures may inflict additional ground faults in the system, now with much higher currents.

Presence of uninterrupted ground fault may pose a significant safety risk: if the current exceeds 4 A – 5 A an electric arc develops, which may be sustained even after the fault is cleared. For that reason, they are chiefly limited to underground and submarine networks, and industrial applications, where the reliability need is high and probability of human contact relatively low. In urban distribution networks with multiple underground feeders, the capacitive current may reach several tens of amperes, posing significant risk for the equipment.

The benefit of low fault current and continued system operation thereafter is offset by inherent drawback that the fault location is hard to detect.

Grounding rods 
According to the IEEE standards, grounding rods are made from material such as copper and steel. For choosing a grounding rod there are several selection criteria such as: corrosion resistance, diameter depending on the fault current, conductivity and others. There are several types derived from copper and steel: copper-bonded, stainless-steel, solid copper, galvanized steel ground. In recent decades, there has been developed chemical grounding rods for low impedance ground containing natural electrolytic salts. and Nano-Carbon Fiber Grounding rods.

Grounding connectors 

Connectors for earthing installation are a means of communication between the various components of the earthing and lightning protection installations (earthing rods, earthing conductors, current leads, busbars, etc.).

For high voltage installations, exothermic welding is used for underground connections.

Soil resistance 

Soil resistance is a major aspect in the design and calculation of an earthing system/grounding installation. Its resistance determines the efficiency of the diversion of unwanted currents to zero potential (ground). The resistance of a geological material depends on several components: the presence of metal ores, the temperature of the geological layer, the presence of archeological or structural features, the presence of dissolved salts, and contaminants, porosity and permeability. There are several basic methods for measuring soil resistance. The measurement is performed with two, three or four electrodes. The measurement methods are: pole-pole, dipole-dipole, pole-dipole, Wenner method, and the Schlumberger method.

See also

 Electrical wiring
 Ground and neutral
 Soil resistivity

References

General
 IEC 60364-1: Electrical installations of buildings — Part 1: Fundamental principles, assessment of general characteristics, definitions. International Electrotechnical Commission, Geneva.
 John Whitfield: The Electricians Guide to the 16th Edition IEE Regulations, Section 5.2: Earthing systems, 5th edition.
 Geoff Cronshaw: Earthing: Your questions answered. IEE Wiring Matters, Autumn 2005.
EU Leonardo ENERGY earthing systems education center: Earthing systems resources
 Dmitry Makarov: What Is a TN-C-S Earthing System? Definition, Meaning, Diagrams.

Electric power distribution
Electrical wiring
Electrical safety
IEC 60364